John C. Nickerson Jr. (November 18, 1915 – March 1, 1964) was a colonel in the United States Army and a Redstone Arsenal employee. He fought in World War II and then became involved in the Army Ballistic Missile Agency. In 1957, Nickerson became the first American to be charged under the Espionage Act after leaking classified national security information to the press during a dispute about missile programs. Convicted, he brief had his rank suspended. He spent the rest of his life in various other military roles before dying in a car accident.

Early life
Nickerson was born in Paris, Kentucky on November 18, 1915. He attended grammar school and high school in Paris and, after graduating, spent one year at the University of Kentucky studying industrial chemistry. Nickerson then moved to West Point, graduating on June 13, 1938.

After graduating, Nickerson was commissioned into the Army's Artillery Branch. He held several command positions of increasing rank inside the United States before, in December 1943, being sent to France as a lieutenant colonel. There Nickerson served as commanding officer of the 56th Field Artillery Battalion, 8th Infantry Division, participating at the Battle of the Bulge. For his service, he was awarded a Silver Star and a bronze oak leaf cluster in lieu of a second. Nickerson was stationed for a time near Cologne, where he observed German V-2 rocket launches; he later credited the experience for his interest in rocketry.

By 1955, Nickerson was based in Washington, D.C. as an ordnance officer. After helping Wernher von Braun prepare a presentation on satellites for the Army, he became involved with von Braun's rocket team, serving as the Army Ballistic Missile Agency's liaison to the Defense Department. At the ABMA, Nickerson began working on the PGM-19 Jupiter ballistic missile program.

Information leak
In 1956, United States Secretary of Defense Charles Wilson announced a restructuring of the United States' missile programs: the Army would be reduced to managing short-range missiles, while the Air Force would take over the development of intermediate- and long-range ballistic missiles. Nickerson, concerned that the 200-mile range limit on the Army's missiles would force the end of the Jupiter program, traveled to D.C. in late November to speak out against Wilson's decision, to little success.

Angered, Nickerson prepared a twelve-page document against Wilson's plan entitled "Considerations on the Wilson Memorandum." The document accused Wilson of corporate corruption in his plan to shift longer range missiles to the Air Force - despite his office, Wilson was still employed by General Motors, whose parts were used by the Air Force's PGM-17 Thor missile. Nickerson also pointed fingers at Admiral Arthur W. Radford, a confidant of Wilson whom Nickerson believed was poisoning the Defense Department against the Army. Nickerson also argued that keeping the missile program within the Army was necessary for national security and for the Army's ability to limit casualties in combat, comparing early missile tests in which the Jupiter missile had successfully flown 3,000 miles and the Thor missile had flown 3 feet. Much of the information Nickerson included in the document, including the results of the missile tests, was classified data.

With "Considerations" completed, Nickerson sent the documents anonymously, through aides and civilian employees, to select journalists and industrialists. "Considerations" reached, among others, Drew Pearson, author of the "Washington Merry-Go-Round" column; Erik Bergaust, managing editor of Missiles & Rockets; and William F. Hunt and John A. Baumann, employees of Reynolds Metal Company and the Radio Corporation of America respectively who were both involved at Redstone Arsenal. Nickerson also personally delivered the document to three members of the Alabama congressional delegation.

Pearson, uncertain if the information in "Considerations" could be legally published, took his copy of the document to the Defense Department to check, where it was promptly seized and universally classified. Federal investigation determined the document to have been produced on a type of typewriter used exclusively by high-ranking Army officers. While the document was initially traced to the ribbon of von Braun's typewriter, questioning headed by Army inspector general David Ogden turned up information that Nickerson regularly borrowed the typewriter for his own use.

Arrest and trial
On the morning of January 2, 1957, Nickerson himself was interrogated by Ogden about the leaked documents. Nickerson feigned ignorance and was directed to return for more questions that afternoon; instead, he returned home and began to burn the classified documents still in his possession. When he failed to appear for the scheduled second round of interrogation, military police traveled to his home and, finding two classified documents in his unlocked desk drawer, arrested him. 

On January 28, Nickerson was charged by the Army with 15 Army security regulations, violation of the Espionage Act by leaking classified documents, and perjury by lying to the inspector general during interrogation. While charged, he was relieved of his duties at Redstone. Though Nickerson faced up to $10,000 in fines and 46 years in prison, he doubted the prosecution's seriousness in charging him with espionage, saying in personal correspondence, "I, therefore, do not expect more than a five hundred dollar fine."

Nickerson's trial began June 25, 1957. Prosecutors quickly dropped the Espionage Act and perjury charges, assessing the risk from requiring classified documents as evidence as greater than the need to convict Nickerson under the higher charges. Instead they settled for a plea deal from Nickerson on the 15 lesser charges, one which he had signed three days prior to the trial.

The remaining four days of Nickerson's hearing were dedicated to the defense's argument for leniency in Nickerson's sentencing. His defense team, led by civilian lawyer Ray Jenkins, argued that Nickerson's leaks were motivated by "loyalty to the Army and country" and were not intended to undermine national security, further alleging that the information included in "Considerations" was already public knowledge to foreign agents. The defense also called character witnesses, including von Braun and Ernst Stuhlinger, to speak on Nickerson's behalf; the prosecution, meanwhile, brought in Nickerson's commanding officer John Bruce Medaris, who framed Nickerson as impulsive and suggested he had no place returning to Army service.

At the end of the trial, following 43 minutes of jury deliberation, Nickerson received his sentence. He was charged a $100 fine per month for 15 months, suspended from his rank as colonel for one year, and formally reprimanded.

Later life and death
After his rank was suspended, Nickerson was appointed to the Panama Canal Zone as a construction inspector. He worked there until his security clearance was restored, after which he was assigned to Fort Bliss, Texas, as an ordnance officer. Nickerson ultimately returned to working in the Army missile program.

On March 1, 1964, both Nickerson and his wife Caroline were killed in a head-on automobile collision on Route 54 near a missile center in Alamogordo, New Mexico.

References

External links
 Colonel John C. Nickerson Collection, The University of Alabama in Huntsville Archives and Special Collections

1915 births
1964 deaths
University of Kentucky alumni
Recipients of the Silver Star
Military personnel from Kentucky
United States Army personnel of World War II
United States Army Field Artillery Branch personnel
People from Paris, Kentucky
United States Military Academy alumni
California Institute of Technology alumni
United States Army colonels
People charged under the Espionage Act of 1917